Schott AG is a German multinational glass company specializing in the manufacture of glass and glass-ceramics. Headquartered in Mainz, Germany, it is owned by the Carl Zeiss Foundation. The company's founder and namesake, Otto Schott, is credited with the invention of borosilicate glass.

History

Founding 

In 1884, Otto Schott, Ernst Abbe, Carl Zeiss and his son Roderich Zeiss founded the Glastechnische Laboratorium Schott & Genossen (Glass Technical Laboratory Schott & Associates) in Jena, which initially produced optical glasses for microscopes and telescopes. In 1891, the Carl Zeiss Foundation founded two years earlier by Ernst Abbe became a partner in the glass laboratory. Schott's Jena glass, an early borosilicate glass, was one of its early manufactured products, and quickly became the leading scientific glass in the world. The invention of borosilicate glass, resistant to chemicals, heat and temperature change, paved the way for new technical glasses for thermometers, laboratory equipment and gas lamps.

 
Otto Schott transferred his shares to the Carl Zeiss Foundation in 1919, fully rendering the glass laboratory a foundation company and renaming it Jenaer Glaswerk Schott & Gen (Jena Glassworks Schott & Assoc.). 

In 1928, Otto Schott's son Erich Schott, born in 1891, took over the company's management. He further strengthened its market position by developing new business fields, such as specialty glass components for electrical engineering and heat resistant borosilicate glassware.

Split 
In the midst of Germany’s political division after World War II, the Jena factory was expropriated transformed into a state-owned entity in 1948. The company was divided in half: VEB Jenaer Glaswerk in Jena in East Germany, later integrated into the VEB Carl Zeiss Jena collective, and Jenaer Glaswerk Schott & Gen in Mainz in West Germany. While the state-owned company in Jena developed into one of the most important specialty glass suppliers in Eastern Europe, Erich Schott developed an international group in Mainz with sales offices in Europe, the US and Asia. The company became a specialist glass manufacturer with products including glass components for television tubes, fiber optics for light and image conductors, mirror substrates for giant telescopes, glass-ceramic cooktop panels (serial production from 1973) and glass tubes for parabolic trough power plants. Following the German reunification, the Mainz plant assumed Jena’s company shares.

Late 20th Century 
The company experienced growth in the first decade after the fall of the Berlin Wall. Schott Glas, as it became known in 1998, developed into a technology group with 80 companies in 32 countries and global sales of over 3 billion Deutschmark. Schott had been operating at only 40 sites in ten countries with global sales of DM 1.31 billion in 1984. In 2004, Schott Glas converted from a dependent enterprise of its sister enterprise Carl Zeiss (Oberkochen) to become a legally independent Aktiengesellschaft—Schott AG. The Carl Zeiss Foundation remains the sole shareholder of Schott AG. The Foundation Statute does not permit to sell its shares, ruling out the prospect of an IPO.

Solar industry 
The technology group entered the solar industry in 2001, founding Schott Solar GmbH in 2005 (renamed Schott Solar AG in 2008). 
In 2008, Schott announced that it planned to produce crystalline photovoltaic cells and modules with a total of 450 MW annually. It also planned to produce thin-film PV wafers with a capacity of 100 MW. In 2009, the company inaugurated a US$100 million solar manufacturing facility in Albuquerque, New Mexico, USA to build solar receivers for concentrated solar thermal power plants (CSP) and 64 MW of photovoltaic modules. They had already been making 15 MW of photovoltaics annually in Billerica, Massachusetts, until the factory was closed in 2009.
The company was also engaged in concentrated solar power technology, by manufacturing solar receiver tubes.
In June 2012, Schott announced that its Albuquerque plant would close down, laying off all photovoltaic cell manufacturing employees immediately and ramping down the remaining employees over the rest of the summer. Schott withdrew from its solar business in 2012 and Schott Solar AG was dissolved.

Company profile 
The supervisory board appointed Frank Heinricht as chairman of the board of management of Schott AG in June 2013. Heinricht, a German physicist with a doctorate in engineering, succeeded Udo Ungeheuer, who had served as Chairman from 2004.

SCHOTT AG established a glass manufacturing facility in India in Jambusar, Gujarat in 1998 under its Indian subsidiary, SCHOTT Glass India Pvt. Ltd.. The plant produces Type I pharma tubing glass, which is used to make pharmaceutical packaging products such as ampoules, vials, syringes and cartridges. 

The German Group also has a 50-50 Joint venture in India with KAISHA Group of Companies, as SCHOTT KAISHA Pvt. Ltd. which produces pharmaceutical packaging products. 

The company started operating in China since 2011, with a large production.

SCHOTT reported sales worth 2.05 billion Euros in its fiscal year 2016–2017. In 2017–2018 sales increase to 2.08 billion euros with an annual profit of 208 million euros. In 2019, SCHOTT reported sales worth 2.2. billion Euros with an annual profit of 206 million euros. SCHOTT AG employs around 16.200 people in production and sales facilities in 34 countries, including around 5,800 in Germany (as of 2019). SCHOTT increased its global sales by 2.2% in 2020 to reach 2.5 billion USD, with an improved operating profit (EBIT) of 320 million USD. The number of employees rose to around 16,500.

The sole owner of Schott AG is the Carl Zeiss Foundation, which holds all shares and is partly financed from the dividends.

Plants in Germany

Mainz: Optical glass, glass-ceramic cooktop panels, fire viewing panels, fiber optics, pharmaceutical tubing
Grünenplan: Thin glass
Jena: Fire-resistant glass
Landshut: Electronic packaging
Mitterteich: Glass tubing, rods and profiles for technical and pharmaceutical applications
Müllheim: Pharmaceutical packaging

Products

Schott produces a wide range of specialty glasses and glass-ceramics in large quantities for many industries, including household appliances, pharmaceuticals, electronics, optics, life sciences, automotive and aerospace. It also manufactures telescope mirror substrates for use in astronomy:

Very Large Telescope (1991–1993: four mirrors of 8.2 m diameter each)
Keck Observatory (1993–1996: two mirror segments of 10.0 m diameter each)
Gran Telescopio Canarias (2007–2008: one mirror segment of 10.4 m diameter)

Schott was commissioned in 2017 to produce four of five mirrors for the European Extremely Large Telescope (ELT), including the primary mirror, which is made up of 798 hexagons.

Schott’s brands include Ceran (glass-ceramic cooktop panels), Pyran (fire-resistant glass), Robax (fire viewing panels), Fiolax (glass tubing for pharmaceutical containers), HelioJet (aircraft cabin lighting), Puravis (fiber optics for medical technology) and Zerodur (glass-ceramic for telescope mirror substrates and the semiconductor industry).

Notes

References

Glassmaking companies of Germany
Companies based in Mainz
Solar energy companies
Companies established in 1884
German brands
1884 establishments in Germany
Multinational companies headquartered in Germany